Precise Time and Time Interval (PTTI) is a Department of Defense military and Global Positioning System standard which details a mechanism and waveform for distributing highly accurate timing information.

It is similar to pulse per second (PPS) because it indicates the start of each second using a pulse.  PTTI also provides the full Time Of Day (TOD) in hours, minutes, and seconds.

See also
 Clock signal
 Inter-Range Instrumentation Group (IRIG) time codes
 Pulse Per Second (PPS) (1PPS)
 Square wave
 Timecode

References

External links
 DOD-STD-1399-441 Interface Standard for Shipboard Systems Section 441 Precise Time and Time Interval (PTTI)

Timekeeping